NIET may refer to:

 National Individual Events Tournament, a national forensic-speaking tournament in the United States

See also
 Niet, a punk rock and hardcore punk band from Ljubljana, Slovenia